David Allen Jaeger is a professor of economics at the University of St Andrews, a Research Fellow at IZA Institute of Labor Economics, and a Research Fellow at the Centre for Economic Policy Research.  He was previously a professor of economics at the CUNY Graduate Center and a Research Fellow in the National Bureau of Economic Research. He is the author of numerous papers in labor economics, the economics of conflict, and econometrics, including a widely cited paper on the consequences of using weak instruments in instrumental variable estimation.  He completed his B.A. in economics at Williams College in 1986 and his Ph.D. in economics at the University of Michigan in 1995.  He also holds an M.A. in statistics from the University of Michigan.  Since 2021 he is the Editor of the Scottish Journal of Political Economy.

In 1995 he was the first winner of the W.E. Upjohn Institute Dissertation Award.  In 2003-2004 he was the recipient of a fellowship from the Alexander von Humboldt Foundation.

David Jaeger is married to the medieval historian Alison Beach.

References

External links
 David A. Jaeger's Homepage
 David A. Jaeger at Google Scholar
 David A. Jaeger at RePEc

Living people
1964 births
20th-century American economists
21st-century American economists
University of Michigan alumni
Williams College alumni
Academics of the University of St Andrews
City University of New York faculty
Academic staff of the University of Cologne
College of William & Mary faculty